Fazio Fabbrini (5 February 1926 – 10 December 2018) was an Italian politician who served as a Senator (1968–1976) and the Mayor of Siena (1965–1966).

Biography
Fabbrini was born in Abbadia San Salvatore, Italy in 1926. His father, Alessandro, was a member of the Communist Party of Italy. During the Italian Civil War, Fabbrini was a anti-fascist partisan, participating in combat against the government of Benito Mussolini. After the war, he continued to remain involved in anti-fascist politics with the Communist Party. 

During the Ninth National Congress of the Communist Party of Italy, in 1962, Fabbrini was elected to the Central Committee of the party, a post he held until 1970. 

Fabbrini served as Mayor of Siena between January 1965 and July 1966. 

In 1968, he became a member of the Italian Senate. Subsequently, he was selected by the Senate to be a Member of European Parliament. As an MEP, Fabbrini was outspoken on several issues, particularly against corruption and bribery. 

He left politics in 1976, and died in Siena in 2018, aged 92.

References

1926 births
2018 deaths
Italian Communist Party politicians
Senators of Legislature V of Italy
Mayors of Siena
Politicians from Siena
Senators of Legislature VI of Italy
Italian partisans